NGC 6946, sometimes referred to as the Fireworks Galaxy, is a face-on intermediate spiral galaxy with a small bright nucleus, whose location in the sky straddles the boundary between the northern constellations of Cepheus and Cygnus. Its distance from Earth is about 25.2 million light-years or 7.72 megaparsecs, similar to the distance of M101 (NGC 5457) in the constellation Ursa Major.  Both were once considered to be part of the Local Group, but are now known to be among the dozen bright spiral galaxies near the Milky Way but beyond the confines of the Local Group. NGC 6946 lies within the Virgo Supercluster.

The galaxy was discovered by William Herschel on 9 September 1798. It is heavily obscured by interstellar matter due to its location close to the galactic plane of the Milky Way. Due to its prodigious star formation it has been classified as an active starburst galaxy. NGC 6946 has also been classified as a double-barred spiral galaxy, with the inner, smaller bar presumably responsible for funneling gas into its center.

Various unusual celestial objects have been observed within NGC 6946. This includes the so-called 'Red Ellipse' along one of the northern arms that looks like a super-bubble or very large supernova remnant, and which may have been formed by an open cluster containing massive stars. There are also two regions of unusual dark lanes of nebulosity, while within the spiral arms several regions appear devoid of stars and gaseous hydrogen, some spanning up to two kiloparsecs across. A third peculiar object, discovered in 1967, is now known as "Hodge's Complex". This was once thought to be a young supergiant cluster, but in 2017 it was conjectured to be an interacting dwarf galaxy superimposed on NGC 6946.

Supernovae
Ten  supernovae have been observed in NGC 6946 in the 20th and early 21st century: SN 1917A, SN 1939C, SN 1948B, SN 1968D, SN 1969P, SN 1980K, SN 2002hh, SN 2004et, SN 2008S, and SN 2017eaw. For this reason NGC 6946 has sometimes been referred to as the "Fireworks Galaxy". This is about ten times the rate observed in our Milky Way galaxy, even though the Milky Way has twice as many stars as NGC 6946.

On 27 September 2004, the Type II supernova SN 2004et was observed at magnitude 15.2 and rose to a maximum visual magnitude of 12.7. Images taken during the preceding days revealed that the supernova explosion occurred on 22 September. The progenitor of the supernova was identified on earlier images –– only the seventh time that such an event was directly identified with its host star. The red supergiant progenitor had an initial mass of about 15 in an interacting binary system shared with a blue supergiant.

During 2009, a bright star within NGC 6946 flared up over several months to become over one million times as bright as the Sun. Shortly thereafter it faded rapidly. Observations with the Hubble Space Telescope suggest that the star did not survive, although there remains some infrared emission from its position. This is thought to come from debris falling onto a black hole that formed when the star died. This potential black hole-forming star is designated N6946-BH1. The progenitor is believed to have been a yellow hypergiant star.

In May 2017, supernova SN 2017eaw was detected in the northwest region of the galaxy, and light curves obtained over the next 600 days showed that it was a Type II-P. The progenitor was determined to have been a red supergiant, with a mass of around 15.

More supernovae have been seen in NGC 6946 than in any other galaxy.

See also
IC 342 - similar galaxy heavily obscured by Milky Way stars and dust.
List of galaxies

References

External links

 SEDS: Spiral Galaxy NGC 6946
 Atlas of the Universe
 N6946-BH1 Giant Star Becomes A Black Hole Right Before Our Eyes!
 

Cepheus (constellation)
Cygnus (constellation)
Intermediate spiral galaxies
6946
11597
65001
029
012b
17980909
Virgo Supercluster